Matthew Hoyle (born 26 April 1991) is a British motorcycle racer who has competed in the Red Bull MotoGP Rookies Cup and the 125cc World Championship. He won the British 125cc Championship in 2008.

Career statistics

Red Bull MotoGP Rookies Cup

Races by year
(key) (Races in bold indicate pole position, races in italics indicate fastest lap)

Grand Prix motorcycle racing

By season

Races by year
(key)

References

External links
 Profile on MotoGP.com

1991 births
Living people
British motorcycle racers
125cc World Championship riders